Lucifer and Prometheus is a work of psychological literary criticism written by R.J. Zwi Werblowsky and published in 1952. In it, Werblowsky argues that the Satan of John Milton's Paradise Lost became a disproportionately appealing character because of attributes he shares with the Greek Titan Prometheus. It has been called "most illuminating" for its historical and typological perspective on Milton's Satan as embodying both positive and negative values. The book has also been significant in pointing out the essential ambiguity of Prometheus and his dual Christ-like/Satanic nature as developed in the Christian tradition.

Werblowsky uses the terminology of Carl Jung and his school in examining "mythological projections of the human psyche", though he emphasizes that he is not interested in the concept of the archetype in the strict Jungian sense. Rather, he sees the myth of figures such as Satan and Prometheus as expressing "the shortcomings … of the world as conceived by the human soul." The relation of power and civilization is explored through the interaction of the concepts of Old Testament sin and Greek hubris. In this analysis, Satan "becomes the sole power-exponent in this sublunar, post-lapsarian but pre-eschatological universe, and thus stands as the prototype of human civilizing effort."

Werblowsky sets out to explore "the heroic at its limits", and makes explicit the motivating factor of World War II and its horrors in undertaking this study:

Lucifer and Prometheus was one of 204 volumes in The International Library of Psychology, Philosophy and Scientific Method series published 1910–1965 and including titles from Jung, Sigmund Freud, Jean Piaget, Erich Fromm and others. It was Werblowsky's first published book. This volume was reissued in 1999 by Routledge. It includes an introduction written by Jung.

Notes

Citations

References
 Werblowsky, Raphael Jehudah Zwi. Lucifer and Prometheus: A Study of Milton's Satan. Routledge, reprinted 1999 and 2001; originally published 1952.

Books of literary criticism
John Milton
Analytical psychology
Literary archetypes
Luciferianism
Mythological archetypes
Prometheus
1952 non-fiction books